Roland J. "Duke" Ealey (June 20, 1914 – March 23, 1992) is a former member of the Virginia House of Delegates from Richmond. In 1983, following the death of Delegate James S. Christian, Jr., who had been elected to represent the newly created 70th district, Ealey won a special election for the position. He served until his own death in 1992.

In 2004 the House of Delegates designated June 20 as "Delegate Roland J. Ealey Day" in Virginia.

References

External links
 

1914 births
1992 deaths
African-American state legislators in Virginia
Democratic Party members of the Virginia House of Delegates
20th-century American politicians
Virginia Union University alumni
Howard University School of Law alumni
People from Kershaw, South Carolina
Politicians from Richmond, Virginia
20th-century African-American politicians
African-American men in politics